On 29 August 2020, riots broke out in the Swedish cities of Malmö and Ronneby. After Swedish police prevented Rasmus Paludan, a Danish politician, from entering the country, far-right anti-immigration activists held protests and burned the Quran. In response, a mob of 300 people gathered in counter-protest, burned tires, threw rocks and chunks of concrete at the police, and smashed bus shelters, and witnesses heard shouts of "Allāhu ʾakbar" and "La ilaha ilallah". A prominent Malmö imam responded "Those who are acting in this way have nothing to do with Islam."

Incidents in Malmö
On 26 August 2020, police in Malmö denied Rasmus Paludan, a Danish far-right politician and the leader of Denmark's Hard Line party, permission to hold a meeting named "Islamization in the Nordic countries". On 28 August, he was deported and banned from entering Sweden. Swedish police suspected he would break the law. His supporters nonetheless went ahead with the event, and burned a copy of the Qur'an in Rosengard, a predominantly immigrant neighborhood. In a separate event, Paludan's supporters kicked a copy of the Qur'an around Malmö's main square like a football, for which three people were arrested on suspicion of inciting hatred. 

At around 7 PM, about 300 people gathered in Malmö's Amiralsgatan street, south of the Rosengård Centrum Shopping Centre for a demonstration against the Qur'an burning, which soon turned violent. Rioters threw chunks of concrete and stones at the police, smashed bus shelters, overturned lampposts, and burned objects. Antisemitic chants were also raised in the gatherings. The riots continued till about 3 in the morning.

The police in Malmö received reinforcements from Gothenburg and police began using drones for aerial surveillance of the Rosengård district.

The unrest continued the following day, there were multiple incidents with arson in the Rosengård, Bellevuegården, Rådmansvången and Solbacken city districts. The Gullviskolan school was severely damaged by suspected arson. Three people were arrested with bottles containing flammable liquid suspected for preparing attacks on police or rescue services.

The riots gradually came to an end by 31 August after residents, police and religious leaders took to the streets to promote calm.

The rioters caused damage worth about a million crowns (about 100 thousand euro). Most of the costs were due to replacing and repairing street lights, traffic lights, bus shelters and cleaning up the area. This sum does not include costs for police actions.

Incidents in Ronneby 
The riots spread to Ronneby the following day when about 20 persons were involved in public violence in Ronneby, where they set fire to tires, threw rocks at police, emergency services and buildings. A policeman was wounded when he was struck by a rock. Arriving police were at first outmatched and had to retreat and wait for reinforcements. Three people were arrested and six were detained, suspected of violent rioting. The rioters protested against the burning of a Quran in front of a community building which was used by the Arab culture association (Swedish: Arabiska kulturföreningen) for Friday prayers. According to an eyewitness, the rioters attempted to set fire to a church in Ronneby but a bystander put out the fire with his jacket, whereupon the rioters attacked him and he was wounded. The riot got extensive exposure in social media.

Aftermath 
About 15 people were arrested, and several police officers were injured. Most of the suspects of the Ronneby riots were men aged 18-30 and previously known to police for trading narcotics, vandalism and theft. All spokesmen interviewed by public service broadcaster SVT agreed that the rioters weren't "true Muslims". A prominent Malmö imam responded "Those who are acting in this way have nothing to do with Islam".

On 31 August, the police started investigating reports of antisemitic hate speech from the Muslim rioters.

In November 2020, prosecutors declared that burning the Qu'ran does not constitute hate speech against a minority and therefore halted the investigation.

Related events
On 29 August, clashes broke out at an anti-Islam rally Oslo, Norway, after a protester desecrated the Qur'an at the rally.

See also
Quran desecration
List of riots in Sweden
2008 Malmö mosque riots
2022 Sweden riots
Islam in Sweden 
Immigration and crime

References

2020 riots
2020s in Malmö
Counter-jihad
Events in Malmö
Race riots in Sweden
Religious riots
August 2020 events in Sweden
Quran-related controversies